Radio Lukavac is a Bosnian local public radio station, broadcasting from Lukavac, Bosnia and Herzegovina.

It was launched during the war in Bosnia and Herzegovina on 11 January 1993 as local/municipal radio station. It broadcasts a variety of programs such as news, music, morning and talk shows. Program is mainly produced in Bosnian language.

Estimated number of potential listeners of Radio Lukavac in Tuzla Canton area is around 170.247. Local cable television channel TV Lukavac is also part of public municipality services. Program is available via IPTV platform Moja TV (Channel 186) for listeners in BiH and in diaspora.

Frequencies
 Lukavac

See also 
List of radio stations in Bosnia and Herzegovina

References

External links 
 www.rtvlukavac.ba
 Communications Regulatory Agency of Bosnia and Herzegovina

Lukavac
Radio stations established in 1993